Ketterman may refer to:

Ketterman, Missouri, an unincorporated community
Ketterman, West Virginia, a ghost town